The Nanjing decade (also Nanking decade, or the Golden decade) is an informal name for the decade from 1927 (or 1928) to 1937 in the Republic of China. It began when Nationalist Generalissimo Chiang Kai-shek took Nanjing from Zhili clique warlord Sun Chuanfang halfway through the Northern Expedition in 1927.  Chiang declared it to be the national capital despite the existence of a left-wing Nationalist government in Wuhan. The Wuhan faction gave in and the Northern Expedition continued until the Beiyang government in Beijing was overthrown in 1928. The decade ended with the outbreak of the Second Sino-Japanese War in 1937 and the retreat of the Nationalist government to Wuhan. GDP growth averaged 3.9 per cent a year from 1929 to 1941 and per capita GDP about 1.8 per cent. Historians view the decade as a period of Chinese conservatism.

Nanjing was of symbolic and strategic importance. The Ming dynasty had made Nanjing a capital, the republic had been established there in 1912, and Sun Yat-sen's provisional government had been there. Sun's body was brought and placed in a grand mausoleum to cement Chiang's legitimacy. Chiang was born in nearby Chekiang and the general area had strong popular support for him.

The Nanjing decade was marked by both progress and frustration. The period was far more stable than the preceding Warlord Era. There was enough stability to allow economic growth and the start of ambitious government projects, some of which were taken up again by the new government of the People's Republic after 1949. Nationalist foreign service officers negotiated diplomatic recognition from Western governments and began to unravel the unequal treaties. Entrepreneurs, educators, lawyers, doctors, and other professionals were more free to create modern institutions than at any earlier time. However, the Nationalist government also suppressed dissent, corruption and nepotism were rampant and revolts broke out in several provinces; internal conflicts also perpetuated within the government. The Nationalists were never able to fully pacify the Chinese Communist Party, and struggled to address the widespread unrest and protests over their failure to check Japanese aggression.

The party-state 

The organization and function of the KMT one-party state was derived from Sun's "Three Stages of Revolution" and his policy of Dang Guo.  The first stage was military unification, which was carried out with the Northern Expedition.  The second was "political tutelage" which was a provisional government led by the KMT to educate people about their political and civil rights, and the third stage was constitutional government.  The KMT considered themselves to be at the second stage in 1928.

The KMT set up its five-branch government (based on the Three Principles of the People) using an organic law including Executive Yuan, Legislative Yuan, Judicial Yuan, Control Yuan and Examination Yuan.  This government disavowed continuity with the defunct Beiyang government that enjoyed international recognition; however the state was still the same – the Republic of China.  Nevertheless, many bureaucrats from the Beiyang government flooded into Nanjing to receive jobs.

Chiang was elected President of the National Government by the KMT central executive committee in October 1928.  In the absence of a National Assembly, the KMT's party congress functioned in its place. Since party membership was a requirement for civil service positions, the KMT was full of careerists and opportunists.

The KMT was heavily factionalized into pro- and anti-Chiang groups. The largest faction in the party following reunification was the pro-Chiang Whampoa clique (a.k.a. the National Revolutionary Army First Army Group/Central Army), which made up slightly over half of the party membership. A Whampoa sub-faction was the infamous Blue Shirts Society.  Next was the CC Clique, a pro-Chiang civilian group. A third group, the technocratic Political Study Clique, was more liberal than the other two pro-Chiang factions.  They were formed by KMT members of the first National Assembly back in 1916.  These three factions competed with each other for Chiang's favor.

Opposition to Chiang came from both the left and the right. The leftist opposition was led by Wang Jingwei and known as the Reorganizationists.  The rightist opposition was led by Hu Hanmin.  Hu never created or joined a faction but he was viewed as the spiritual leader by the Western Hills Group, led by Lin Sen.  There were also individuals within the party who were not part of any faction, like Sun Fo.  These anti-Chiang figures were outnumbered in the party but held great power by their seniority, unlike many pro-Chiang cadres that joined only during or after the Northern Expedition.  Chiang cleverly played these factions off against one another.  The party itself was reduced to a mere propaganda machine, while real power lay with Chiang and the National Revolutionary Army (NRA).

Intra-party struggles 

In 1922, the KMT had formed the First United Front with the Communists to defeat the warlords and reunify China. In April 1927, however, Chiang split with the Communists and purged them from the Front against the wishes of the KMT leadership in Wuhan, setting up a rival KMT government in Nanjing.  The split and the purge was detrimental to the KMT's Northern Expedition and allowed the Zhili-Fengtian coalition to launch a successful counterattack. The mostly leftist Wuhan faction soon purged the Communists as well and reunited with Chiang in Nanjing. The Northern Expedition restarted in February 1928 and successfully reunited China by the end of the year.

At the end of the Expedition, the NRA consisted of four army groups: Chiang's Whampoa clique, Feng Yuxiang's Guominjun, Yan Xishan's Shanxi clique, and Li Zongren's New Guangxi clique.  Chiang did not have direct control of the other three so he considered them to be threats.

In February 1929, Li Zongren fired the pro-Chiang governor of Hunan but Chiang objected and the two clashed in March, leading to Li's defeat and (temporary) expulsion from the KMT by the third party congress.  Feng Yuxiang rebelled on May 19 but was humiliated when half of his army defected through bribery.  From October to February, fighting resumed with Wang Jingwei and Lin Sen joining the opposition.  In May 1930, the Central Plains War erupted, pitting Chiang against the Beiping faction of Yan Xishan, Feng Yuxiang, Li Zongren, and Wang Jingwei.  Though victorious, the conflict left Chiang's government bankrupt.

In 1931, Hu Hanmin attempted to block Chiang's provisional constitution and was put under house arrest.  This caused another uprising by Chen Jitang, Li Zongren, Sun Fo and other anti-Chiang factions who converged on Guangzhou to set up a rival government.  War was averted due to the Japanese invasion of Manchuria but it did cause Chiang to release Hu and resign as president and premier.  Chiang's influence was restored when he was made chairman of the Military Affairs Commission at the start of the Battle of Shanghai (1932).  Hu moved to Guangzhou and led an autonomous government in Liangguang.

In November 1933, the Fujian Rebellion erupted by dissident KMT elements.  The rebellion was crushed in January.

During Chiang's second premiership, Hu Hanmin died on 12 May 1936 and left a power vacuum in the south.  Chiang wanted to fill it with a loyalist that would end the south's autonomy.  Chen Jitang and Li Zongren conspired to overthrow Chiang but were politically outmaneuvered by bribes and defections.  Chen resigned and the plot fizzled.  In December, Chiang was kidnapped by Zhang Xueliang and forced to ally with the Communists in the Second United Front to combat the Japanese occupation.

In addition, the Ma clique and the Xinjiang clique, both KMT affiliates, were contesting each other in the western fringes from 1931 until 1937 in the Xinjiang Wars when the Soviet Union's support helped the Xinjiang group to triumph.  Xinjiang then became a Soviet protectorate and safe haven for Communists.  The Ma clique also fought Sun Dianying in 1934.

Wang Jingwei's collaborationist government during the Second Sino-Japanese War can be seen as an extension of these party power struggles.

These civil wars extended Chiang's direct rule from four provinces to eleven just prior to the Marco Polo Bridge Incident.

Suppression of Communists and other parties 
The Chinese Civil War which began with the purge of communists in 1927 would continue until the forming of the Second United Front in December 1936. During this period, the Nationalists tried destroying the Communists by using Encirclement Campaigns.  The failure of early Communist strategy of urban warfare led to the rise of Mao Zedong who advocated guerrilla warfare. The Communists were much weaker in the urban areas due to secret police repression led by Dai Li. Many Communists and suspected or actual Communist sympathizers were imprisoned, including the wife and four year old daughter of Marshal Nie.

Other parties that were heavily persecuted were the Young China Party and the "Third Party".  They would remain banned until the Second Sino-Japanese War when they were allowed into the Second United Front as part of the China Democratic League.

Warlord conflicts during the Nanjing decade 
 Warlord Rebellion in northeastern Shandong
 Beijing Revolt
 Central Plains War
 Han–Liu War
 War in Ningxia (1934)

Conflicts with Japan and Soviet Union 
Sino-Soviet conflict (1929)
Soviet Invasion of Xinjiang
Xinjiang War (1937)
Nanking incident of 1927
Jinan incident

Reforms 
China's first government sponsored social engineering program began in 1934 with the New Life Movement. In addition, non-governmental reforms, such as the Rural Reconstruction Movement made substantial progress in addressing the problems of the countryside. Many social activists who participated in this movement were graduated as professors of the United States. They made tangible but limited progress in modernizing the tax, infrastructural, economic, cultural, and educational equipment and mechanisms of rural regions until the cancellation of government coordination and subsidies in the mid-to-late 1930s due to rampant wars and the lack of resources. The rural reconstructive activists advocated a “third way” between the communist violent land reform and the reformism of the Nationalist Government based on the respect of human rights and individual liberties for  educational doctrine.

Economic improvements and social reforms were mixed. The Kuomintang supported women’s rights and education, the abolition of polygamy, and foot binding. The government of the Republic of China under Chiang’s leadership also enacted a women’s quota in the parliament with reserved seats for women.  During the Nanjing Decade, average Chinese citizens received the education they’d never had the chance to get in the dynasties that increased the literacy rate across China. The education also promotes the ideals of Tridemism of democracy, republicanism, science, constitutionalism, and Chinese Nationalism based on the Political Tutelage of the Kuomintang. However, Periodic famines continued under Nationalist rule: in Northern China from 1928 to 1930, in Sichuan from 1936 to 1937, and in Henan from 1942 to 1943. In total, these famines cost at least 11.7 million lives by some estimates. GDP growth averaged 3.9 per cent a year from 1929 to 1941 and per capita GDP about 1.8 per cent. Among other institutions, the Nationalist Government founded the Academia Sinica and the Central Bank of China. In 1932, China sent a team for the first time to the Olympic Games.

Economic developments 

The figures provided by Liu and Yeh are deemed to be more reliable.

*A catty being equivalent to roughly 600 grams

*the cost of collecting taxes is deducted for all years excluding 1928-29

** mostly consisting of stamp tax, provincial remittances, government business profits and miscellaneous sources

Fiscal measures 
The Nationalist Government in Nanjing following the northern expedition had achieved nominal unification of China and sort to establish its control over China's revenue. Tariff autonomy was regained by 1930 this led to higher duties which saw a rapid increase in the revenue of the central government the collection of tariffs was also changed from silver to gold this was due to the falling price of silver following the Great Depression. The Salt tax which previously was seized by local and provincial officials was brought back into Nationalist control whilst transfers to the provinces still did occur the Nationalist government obtained a larger share of the revenue. The Likin a tax that heavily targeted internal trade and was abused in its collection was mostly abolished.

However, the Nationalist government mainly drew its revenue from the modern sectors of the economy and the collection of taxes from agriculture was not controlled by Nanjing given that agriculture comprised a large section of the economy this severely limited the ability of the Nationalist government to raise revenue effectively leading to large amounts of borrowing and the issuing of bonds to pay for its expenditures. The land tax remained in the hands of the provinces who did not reform or improve its collection. The surrender of the land tax to the provinces in 1928 surrendered some 65% of the GDP to the authority of the provinces to collect taxes from this was made for political reasons mainly to achieve national unity by allowing the provinces to maintain a source of income who.

Government debt grew by a considerable amount during this period due to the rising military expenditures as Chiang sought to modernise the Chinese military as the Chinese government floated over 1.6 Billion Yuan worth of bonds on the Chinese market leading to a total bond debt of 2 billion Yuan by 1936. The Shanghai and wider Chinese bond market worked well with the Nationalist government providing significant cash flow to the government.

Conclusion 
The decade came to an end with the Second Sino-Japanese War.  Being located near the coast, it was vulnerable so the capital was moved to Chongqing for the duration of the war. While the transfer of the capital marked its political end, the symbolic end  was the Nanjing Massacre (the Rape of Nanjing) when up to 300,000 inhabitants died during the Japanese occupation.

See also

Timeline of events leading to World War II in Asia

References

Peter Zarrow. China in War and Revolution, 1895–1949. Includes Chapter 13: "The Nanjing decade, 1928–1937: The Guomindang era" (pp. 248–270). Routledge, 2005. .

1920s in China
1930s in China
Right-wing politics in China
Conservatism in China